Minnetonka is a neighbourhood in the city of Winnipeg, Manitoba, Canada, located in the southern section of the district of St. Vital. It is bounded by the Red River on the west and south, Bishop Grandin Boulevard on the north, and St. Mary's Road on the east. As of the 2016 census, Minnetonka had a population of 4,285. On some maps, Minnetonka is called Riel.

History 
The area was first permanently settled in the 19th century. One early settler was Julie Riel, the mother of Louis Riel, whose house on River Road is now Riel House National Historic Site. Minnetonka is mainly residential, with some light commercial (mainly retail) activity along St. Mary's Road.

Facilities

Minnetonka is home to Darwin School, Minnetonka School, River of Life Nazarene Church, and St. John the Apostle Ukrainian Catholic Church. St. Amant, located on River Road, serves individuals with developmental disabilities and autism, but before 1959 was the provincial tuberculosis hospital.

References

Neighbourhoods in Winnipeg
Minnetonka